Trondheim Airport normally refers to Trondheim Airport, the international airport serving Trondheim.

It may also refer to:
 Trondheim Airport, Jonsvatnet, a former water aerodrome
 Trondheim Airport, Lade, a former airport
 Trondheim Airport, Hommelvik, a former water aerodrome
 Trondheim Heliport, Rosten, a medical heliport
 Trondheim Heliport, St. Olav's University Hospital, a medical helipad situated at St. Olav's University Hospital